Lloyd & Hill (also known as Lloyd & Hill: A Shred of Evidence) is a British television crime drama film, written by Richard Maher, that first broadcast on ITV on 3 October 2001. The film, based upon the novel A Shred of Evidence by author Jill McGown, follows unconventional police detectives Danny Lloyd (Philip Glenister) and Judy Hill (Michelle Collins), as Judy transfers into an East Anglian squad run by Lloyd, her ex-Lover, and is assigned to the case of a strangled schoolgirl. The film gathered 6.95 million viewers on its debut broadcast.

Collins said of her role in the film; "I've always been on the other side of the law, since a very early appearance in The Bill, and it's been very exciting. However, I thought it would nice to be a police officer for a change!" The film was intended as a backdoor pilot for a potential series, although poor critical reception and average viewing figures resulted in the series not being picked up for a full run.  The film was broadcast in the United States on BBC America on 16 January 2003, and has since been made available on streaming service Acorn TV. Notably, the film has never been released on VHS or DVD.

Cast

References

External links

2001 films
2001 television films
British crime films
British television films
Carlton Television
Films shot in the United Kingdom
ITV television dramas
Television series by ITV Studios
2000s English-language films
2000s British films